Liberty Township is a township in Daviess County, in the U.S. state of Missouri.

Liberty Township was established in 1869.

References

Townships in Missouri
Townships in Daviess County, Missouri